Ōmachi may refer to:

Places
 Ōmachi, Nagano (大町市), a city
 Ōmachi, Saga (大町町), a town
 Ōmachi (Kanagawa) (大町), a district in the city of Kamakura

People with the surname
, Japanese golfer
, Japanese footballer

Japanese-language surnames